The 2017 Sparkassen ATP Challenger was a professional tennis tournament played on indoor hard courts in Ortisei, Italy between 9 and 15 October 2017. It was the eighth edition of the tournament which was part of the 2017 ATP Challenger Tour.

Singles main-draw entrants

Seeds

 1 Rankings are as of 2 October 2017.

Other entrants
The following players received wildcards into the singles main draw:
  Matteo Donati
  Federico Gaio
  Patrick Prader
  Lorenzo Sonego

The following player received entry into the singles main draw using a protected ranking:
  Igor Sijsling

The following players received entry from the qualifying draw:
  Kevin Krawietz
  Tim Pütz
  Marc Sieber
  Matteo Viola

The following players received entry as lucky losers:
  Andrea Arnaboldi
  Edan Leshem

Champions

Singles

  Lorenzo Sonego def.  Tim Pütz 6–4. 6–4.

Doubles

 Sander Arends /  Antonio Šančić def.  Jeremy Jahn /  Edan Leshem 6–2, 5–7, [13–11].

External links
Official Website

2017 ATP Challenger Tour
2017
October 2017 sports events in Europe
2017 in Italian tennis